Emmanuel Baah Danquah is a Ghanaian politician and member of the 2nd parliament of the 4th republic of Ghana representing Asutifi North Constituency under the membership of the National Democratic Congress.

Early life 
Emmanuel was born on 20 February 1961 in the Brong Ahafo Region of Ghana. He obtained his Bachelor of Arts degree in economics from University of Ghana. He worked as an educationist before going into politics.

Politics 
Emmanuel began his political Journey in 1993 after he was pronounced winner at the 1992 Ghanaian parliamentary election held on 29 December 1992.

He was elected into the 2nd parliament of the 4th republic of Ghana after he emerged winner at the 1996 Ghanaian General Elections. He defeated Georges Nsiah-Afriyie of the New Patriotic Party and Michael K.Manu of the People's National Convention. Emmanuel Claimed 40.80% of the total votes cast while Georges and Michael both claimed 35.60% and 1.10% respectively. Emmanuel Baah Danquah was defeated by Paul Okoh of the New Patriotic Party who claimed 49.10% of the total votes cast whilst he claimed 44.10% at the 2000 Ghanaian General Elections.

Reference List 

Ghanaian MPs 2005–2009
People from Brong-Ahafo Region
National Democratic Congress (Ghana) politicians
Ghanaian Christians
Living people
1961 births